TakarékBank is a banking and financial services corporation in Hungary and the central institution for more than 60 co-operative banks and their 1,100 branch offices. TakarékBank consolidates its co-operative banks and forms the Takarék Group, which is the fourth largest bank in Hungary by AUM of 1,889 billion Hungarian forint. 

Since its inception in 1989, TakarékBank functions both as a central institution and as a corporate and investment bank. The bank headquartered in Budapest, and as a holding, the Takarék Group defines itself primarily as a service provider for the local cooperative banks and their over 1 million clients. TakarékBank is the short form of the Magyar Takarékszövetkezeti Bank Zrt. (literally "Hungarian Central Co-operative Bank"). TakarékBank represents the interests of the Hungarian Cooperative Financial Institutions at both national and international levels and coordinates and develops the joint strategy within the network. The bank advises and supports his members on legal, taxation, and business management issues. TakarékBank is member of the EACB and the Euro Banking Association. The bank is also member of the Budapest Stock Exchange.

In late 2016 Takarék Group acquired majority stake in FHB Mortgage Bank, thus beginning one of the largest mergers in the Hungarian banking industry.

See also

DZ Bank
Bundesverband der Deutschen Volksbanken und Raiffeisenbanken
Erste Group
OTP Bank
Economy of Hungary

References

External links 
Official website

Banks of Hungary
Companies based in Budapest
Hungarian brands
Banks established in 1989
Financial services companies established in 1989
Investment banks
Online brokerages
Primary dealers